R-360 Neptune is a Ukrainian subsonic anti-ship cruise missile with all-weather capabilities developed by the Luch Design Bureau.

Neptune's design is based on the Soviet Kh-35 subsonic anti-ship missile, with substantially improved range, targeting and electronics equipment. The system requirement was for a single missile to defeat surface warships and transport vessels with a displacement of up to 5,000 tons, either in convoys or moving individually.

The first training missile divizion (battalion) entered service with the Ukrainian Navy in March 2021.

Development 
The missile was first revealed at the 2015  international exhibition in Kyiv.

According to information from open sources, the first flight samples of the cruise missile were manufactured in the second quarter of 2016. Production of advanced missile systems took place in cooperation with other Ukrainian enterprises, including Artem Luch GAhK, Motor Sich (MS-400 turbofan engine), Pivdenne YuMZ Pivdenmash, Lviv  and other radar electronics, Vyshneve ZhMZ Vizar Kyiv,  (seeker), Arsenal SDP SE (navigation system) and others.

The first tests of the system were conducted on 22 March 2016, attended by Secretary of the National Security and Defense Council (NSDC) Oleksandr Turchynov. In mid-2017, Neptune missiles were tested concurrently with Vilkha launchers and missiles. However, unlike the Vilkha, the test results and capabilities of the Neptune were not made public. According to the press service of the NSDC, the first successful flight tests of the system took place on 30 January 2018. On 17 August 2018, the missile successfully hit a target at a range of  during test firings in southern Odesa Oblast. On 6 April 2019, the missile was again successfully tested, hitting targets during tests near Odesa. According to President Petro Poroshenko, Neptune system would be delivered to the Ukrainian military in December 2019.

After the withdrawal of both the United States and the Russian Federation from the Intermediate-Range Nuclear Forces Treaty, Ukraine announced that it was considering developing intermediate-range cruise missiles. Analysts considered an extended-range Neptune missile to be a candidate for such an effort.

Ukraine signed a memorandum with Indonesia on concluding a contract for the supply of a number of Neptune missiles, first reported in December 2020.

In March 2021, the Ukrainian Navy obtained the first training missile battalion of the RK-360MC Neptune.

Operational history 

On 3 April 2022, during the Russian invasion of Ukraine, Ukrainian sources claimed that the  had been damaged by Ukrainian forces. Later, Oleksiy Arestovych, an adviser to the Office of the President of Ukraine, clarified that Admiral Essen had been hit by a Neptune missile. The Russians did not comment on the claim and the ship continued its mission as normal.

The Russian Ministry of Defence stated, without discussing the cause, that a fire had caused munitions to explode and the crew had been fully evacuated. Russia reported the vessel as still being afloat later in the day of the fire, but Russian state media subsequently reported that she had sunk in inclement weather while being towed.

According to Thomas Shugart, a former U.S. Navy submarine commander, s like Moskva have been typically "known for their offensive punch, not for their defensive systems or their damage control". The successful use of the Neptune system to sink the warship was cited by Ukrainian Defence Minister Oleksii Reznikov as giving confidence to Ukraine's allies that more weapon supplies to Ukraine would be worth it.

Design 
When deployed, a Neptune coastal defence system comprises a truck-based USPU-360 mobile launcher, four missiles, a TZM-360 transport/reload vehicle, a RCP-360 command and control vehicle, and a special cargo vehicle. Czech Tatra T815-7 trucks replaced prototype KrAZ vehicles.

Neptune missiles are designed to be housed in transport and launch containers (TLC) with dimensions . It uses a Motor Sich MS-400 engine which has a high thrust-to-weight ratio.

Gallery

See also 

 VCM-01 (Vietnam)
 Atmaca (Turkey)
 Gabriel (Israel)
 Blue Spear (Israel – Singapore)
 Exocet (France)
 Harpoon (United States)
 RBS 15 (Sweden)
 Naval Strike Missile (Norway)
 SSM-700K C-Star (Republic of Korea)

References

External links 
 
 Дослідна протикорабельна ракета «Нептун» (Україна. 2016 рік)
 
 
 

Anti-ship cruise missiles
Anti-ship missiles
Cruise missiles of Ukraine
Weapons and ammunition introduced in 2021